West Greenwich is a town in Kent County, Rhode Island, United States. The population was 6,528 at the 2020 census. West Greenwich was named for the historic town of Greenwich, Kent, England.  It was separated from East Greenwich in 1741. Students go to Exeter-West Greenwich Regional School in West Greenwich.

Geography
Escoheag Hill is located within the town and is the site of a former ski area. Wickaboxet State Forest is also located in West Greenwich.

Demographics

At the 2000 census there were 5,085 people, 1,749 households, and 1,451 families in the town. The racial makeup of the town was 97.70% White, 0.28% African American, 0.24% Native American, 0.57% Asian, 0.24% from other races, and 0.98% from two or more races. Hispanic or Latino of any race were 0.69%.

Of the 1,749 households 42.7% had children under the age of 18 living with them, 72.3% were married couples living together, 7.4% had a female householder with no husband present, and 17.0% were non-families. 13.0% of households were one person and 3.6% were one person aged 65 or older. The average household size was 2.90 and the average family size was 3.18.

The age distribution was 28.4% under the age of 18, 6.1% from 18 to 24, 33.4% from 25 to 44, 25.1% from 45 to 64, and 7.1% 65 or older.  The median age was 37 years. For every 100 females, there were 100.4 males.  For every 100 females age 18 and over, there were 99.5 males.

The median household income was $65,725 and the median family income  was $71,332. Males had a median income of $44,306 versus $32,933 for females. The per capita income for the town was $25,750.  4.2% of the population and 2.5% of families were below the poverty line.  Out of the total population, 2.7% of those under the age of 18 and 15.9% of those 65 and older were living below the poverty line.

Government

In the Rhode Island Senate, West Greenwich is split into three senatorial districts, one of which is currently held by Democrat Leonidas P. Raptakis (District 33) and other by Republican Elaine J. Morgan (District 34). The other, District 21, is currently vacant but was last held by Republican Nicholas D. Kettle before his resignation in February 2018 following a sex scandal. At the federal level, West Greenwich is a part of Rhode Island's 2nd congressional district, which is currently represented by James R. Langevin.

In presidential elections, West Greenwich tends to be a fairly independent or swing municipality with a slight Republican tilt. That red lean was strengthened in 2016 when Donald Trump won the town by 23.5 points, the best performance for a Republican in the town in three decades.

Historic places
Louttit Library (1936)
 West Greenwich Baptist Church and Cemetery (1822)
Stephen Allen House (1787)
Hopkins Hollow Village (1728)

References

External links 

 
Towns in Kent County, Rhode Island
Providence metropolitan area
Towns in Rhode Island